The Muskegon Zephyrs were a minor league professional ice hockey team in the International Hockey League from 1960 to 1965.  Muskegon were Turner Cup champions in 1962. In 1962–63, Zephyrs defenceman Gerry Glaude became the first defenceman in pro hockey history to score 100 points in one season.

For the first four seasons, the team was coached by Moose Lallo. Lallo was replaced by Lorne Davis prior to the start of the 1964–65 season, although, Lallo continued to play for the team.

After the completion of the 1964–65 season, the team was renamed the Muskegon Mohawks.

Season-by-season results

References

Hockeydb.com Muskegon Zephyrs Statistics

International Hockey League (1945–2001) teams
Defunct ice hockey teams in the United States
Ice hockey clubs established in 1960
Sports clubs disestablished in 1965
1960 establishments in Michigan
Professional ice hockey teams in Michigan
1965 disestablishments in Michigan
Sports in Muskegon, Michigan